Julia Taubitz (born 1 March 1996) is a German luger.

She participated at the 2019 FIL World Luge Championships, winning a medal.

Luge results
All results are sourced from the International Luge Federation (FIL) and German Bobsleigh, Luge and Skeleton Federation (BSD).

Olympic Games

World Championships
9 medals – (3 gold, 6 silver)

World Cup

Note: Prior to 2020/21 season, to be classified in sprint standings athletes must compete on all sprint events throughout the season.

European Championships
 2016 Altenberg – 6th in Singles
 2017 Königssee – 8th in Singles
 2018 Sigulda – 6th in Singles
 2019 Oberhof – 5th in Singles
 2020 Lillehammer –  in Singles, 4th in Team relay
 2021 Sigulda – 4th in Singles 
 2022 St. Moritz – 4th in Singles
 2023 Sigulda – 8th in Singles

U23 World Championships
 2016 Königssee–  in Singles
 2017 Innsbruck –  in Singles
 2019 Winterberg –  in Singles

Junior World Championships
 2014 Sigulda –  in Singles
 2015 Lillehammer – 5th in Singles
 2016 Winterberg –  in Singles,  in Team relay

German Championships
 2016 Königssee – 5th in Singles
 2017 Altenberg – 5th in Singles
 2018 Winterberg –  in Singles
 2019 Oberhof –  in Singles
 2020 Königssee –  in Singles
 2021 Altenberg –  in Singles
 2022 Oberhof –  in Singles

References

External links

Julia Taubitz at the Bob und Schlittenverband Deutschland 

1996 births
Living people
German female lugers
Olympic lugers of Germany
Lugers at the 2022 Winter Olympics
People from Annaberg-Buchholz
Sportspeople from Saxony